The Big Blowdown is a 1996 crime novel written by George Pelecanos. It is set in Washington, D.C. and focuses on Peter Karras. It is the first of four books comprising the D.C. Quartet. The other books in this series are King Suckerman, The Sweet Forever and Shame the Devil.

Plot introduction
In 1940s Washington, Pete Karras is betrayed by his friend Joe Recevo and disabled by his former employer Mr. Burke. Karras takes up a job in Nick Stefanos' diner but when Burke's protection racket threatens Stefanos, Karras resists and ultimately gets his revenge.

Explanation of the novel's title
The title comes from something Vera Gardner says to Pete Karras in Chapter 30, describing the destructive power of an atomic blast:

"...And then there was a flash, and the town was just gone. Like a big wind had flattened it all out, blown it all away. Like a big blowdown, Pete."

Characters
Peter Karras, Jimmy Boyle, Joe Recevo, and Perry Angelos are four friends who grew up together in Washington. Angelos is an accountant. Boyle is a police officer. Karras and Recevo work as enforcers for a protection and loan sharking racket run by Mr. Burke. Mr. Burke has several other employees including chief enforcer Reed and advisor Mr. Gearhart. Mr. Bender runs a similar outfit to Burke. Nick Stefanos is the owner of a diner that he runs with his friend "Costa". Junior Oliver is an African American of the same age as the other boys.

Michael and Lola Florek are a brother and sister from Farrell, Pennsylvania. Lola moves to Washington and becomes a prostitute and heroin addict. Her pimp is Morgan and he has a madam called Lydia Fortuno. Eleni Karras is Pete's wife and the two have a son together, Dimitri. Karras is having an affair with a woman named Vera Gardner.

Plot summary
The book opens with a gravely injured Peter Karras in a D.C. hospital in 1946. The plot flashes back to Karras and his friends as children in 1933. Karras gets into a fight with a group of African-American boys and his opponent, Junior Oliver, earns his grudging respect. Next the story jumps to 1944 and the Philippines theatre of World War II. Karras kills his first man and one of his childhood friends, Billy Nicodemus, is killed. Next the book returns to 1946 and we learn Karras has married Eleni, and how he came to be injured. Karras flippant attitude upsets his superior Mr. Burke and when Karras fails to collect a debt from another Greek Burke decides to have him punished. He instructs Recevo to betray his friend Karras. Burke dispatches his enforcer Reed to assault Karras after Recevo sets him up. Reed beats Karras with a baseball bat.

When promiscuous Lola disappears in 1948 after moving to Washington her brother Mike Florek decides to search for her. Eventually Florek takes a job at Nick Stefanos' diner in 1949. Karras is now working there as a chef. Jimmy Boyle, now a beat cop, has become peripherally involved in the investigation of the murder of several prostitutes by a serial killer. Karras correctly suspects that Lola has become a prostitute and aids Florek in his search. Lola's madam Lydia is murdered by the killer and Lola witnesses the crime. Boyle locates Lola for Karras and Karras and Florek extract her from Morgan's brothel. Karras lets Florek and Lola leave town.

Burke targets Stefanos' diner for his protection racket. When Stefanos resists Burke hires Bender's outfit to pressure Stefanos and fool him into believing he needs the protection. Karras sees through the scheme and they lure Bender's men into a trap and kill them.  After rescuing Lola Karras suspects Gearhart as the murderer from her description. He enlists the help of Joe Recevo who informs Burke of Gearhart's murderous tendencies. Burke confronts Gearhart and begins to organize a cover-up. Recevo informs Jimmy Boyle of Gearhart's involvement and tells him to go to his apartment to retrieve the murder weapon. Burke dispatches Reed on the same mission. When Boyle reaches the apartment he is grievously wounded by Gearhart, who had disobeyed Burke's instructions and returned home. Boyle manages to shoot Gearhart in the struggle.

Burke realizes that Karras is the common-link between Boyle and Gearhart and confronts Recevo. He instructs Recevo to bring Karras to him. Recevo brings Karras in but the two make a last stand together and kill Burke, Reed and many of their men before being shot. The book ends with a coda set in 1959 as Stefanos and Costa visiting Karras' grave.

Literary significance and reception 
The Richmond Review compared the novel to the works of James Ellroy and Eddie Bunker. In particular Karras search for redemption through his involvement in solving the prostitute murders sub-plot was described as evoking Ellroy. Reviews praised Pelecanos' dialogue and sense of place. They also remarked upon Pelecanos' use of film and music references and the cinematic nature of the book. Karras has been described as a flawed hero because of his infidelity and lack of commitment to his family. The novel's moral complexity has been praised. The use of violent set pieces has been praised as enlivening the novel.

Awards and nominations 
In 1997, The Big Blowdown was the recipient of the International Crime Novel of the Year award in France, Germany and Japan.

Footnotes 

Novels by George Pelecanos
1996 American novels
Novels set in Washington, D.C.
Fiction set in the 1940s
American crime novels